This article summarises the views and voting record of Labour Party MP Jeremy Corbyn, who was the Leader of the Opposition and Leader of the Labour Party in the United Kingdom from 12 September 2015 until 4 April 2020.

Positioning
Corbyn self-identifies as a socialist. He has also been referred to as a "mainstream [Scandinavian] social democrat". He advocates reversing austerity cuts to public services and some welfare funding made since 2010, as well as renationalisation of public utilities and the railways. A longstanding anti-war and anti-nuclear activist, he supports a foreign policy of military non-interventionism and unilateral nuclear disarmament. Writer Ronan Bennett, who formerly worked as a research assistant to Corbyn, has described him as "a kind of vegan, pacifist idealist, one with a clear understanding of politics and history, and a commitment to the underdog".

In 1997, the political scientists David Butler and Dennis Kavanagh described Corbyn's political stance as "far-left". Corbyn has described Karl Marx as a "great economist" and said he has read some of the works of Adam Smith, Marx and David Ricardo and has "looked at many, many others". However, some have argued that Corbyn is less radical than previously described: for example, the journalist George Eaton has called him "Keynesian". In 2023, The Daily Telegraph reported that most of the tax policies in Corbyn's 2019 general election manifesto had been implemented by the winning Conservative government, including a higher corporation tax, a windfall tax on oil companies, a reduction in annual tax allowances on dividend income, raising income tax on high earners, and introducing a digital services tax on online retailers.

Taxation and economy

Corbyn has campaigned against Private Finance Initiative (PFI) schemes and supported a higher rate of income tax for higher earners. He argues that many well off people are "quite happy to pay more tax to fund better public services or to pay down our debt", and criticised then-Chancellor of the Exchequer George Osborne for offering tax cuts for higher rate taxpayers. He opposes the idea that the UK budget deficit should be reduced to meet an "arbitrary deadline", but also said that Labour would not reintroduce a current budget deficit if budgets were balanced before 2020.

Corbyn also planned to reduce the £93 billion which companies receive in tax relief according to Kevin Farnsworth, a Senior Lecturer in Social Policy at York University. This amount is made up by several reliefs, including railway and energy subsidies, regional development grants, lower corporation tax for small businesses, relief on investment and government procurement from the private sector.

He has described year-on-year corporation tax cuts for companies with profits over £300,000 by current British Governments as a "race to the bottom". In 1990, Corbyn participated in the tax resistance movement against the Community Charge, also known as the Poll Tax, for which he faced imprisonment. In 2015, Corbyn suggested bringing in a land value tax to help tackle high housing costs, and the 2017 Labour manifesto said that a Labour government would consider a land value tax.

Corbyn has raised the prospect of devolving income tax rates to English regions, meaning each region could charge a different income tax rate. Corbyn said "We have a tax-raising power in Scotland but not in English regions. I want genuine regional taxation powers [in England]".

Bank of England policy
During his first Labour leadership election campaign, Corbyn proposed to have the Bank of England print money to invest in housing and public transport, described by Corbyn as "People's Quantitative Easing". This would aim to turn the UK into a high-skill, high-tech economy and to build more council houses in order to lower long-term housing benefit costs. To achieve this, the Bank would purchase bonds for a State-owned "National Investment Bank". Richard Murphy stated that People's Quantitative Easing would only be used in lieu of Quantitative easing.

The Nobel Prize in Economics winner Paul Krugman argued in The New York Times that "On economic policy, in particular, the striking thing about the leadership contest was that every candidate other than Mr. Corbyn essentially supported the Conservative government's austerity policies. ... The Corbyn upset isn't about a sudden left turn on the part of Labour supporters. It's mainly about the strange, sad moral and intellectual collapse of Labour moderates".

Robert Skidelsky offered an endorsement of Corbyn's proposals to carry out QE through a National Investment Bank with minor quibbles. As the policy would change the central bank's focus on stabilising prices, however, it has been argued it would increase the perceived risk of investing in the UK and raise the prospect of increased inflation. It might also clash with Article 123 of the EU's Lisbon Treaty which prevents central banks from printing money to finance government spending and could cause a legal battle with the European Court of Justice.

His second leadership campaign saw him promise £500 billion in additional public spending, though he never mentioned how he planned to fund it. As well as investing in new homes including council houses, universal childcare, the renationalisation of the railways and more publicly-controlled bus services, he has also proposed 'billions for ignored seaside towns' in the south east under a £30 billion regional investment bank for the south east outside of London; investment in former mining areas; and in the Arts, including a £1 billion cultural capital fund.

Corbyn has been a consistent supporter of renationalising public utilities, such as the former British Rail and energy companies. Initially, Corbyn suggested renationalising the entire railway network, but would now bring it under public control "line by line" as franchises expire.

Trade unions

He was one of sixteen signatories to an open letter to then-Labour leader Ed Miliband in January 2015 calling for Labour to strengthen collective bargaining arrangements.

Corbyn is in favour of repealing a government proposed trade union bill which he has described as a "threat to us all". The bill would require higher strike voting thresholds, place restrictions on strikes in key areas such as transport, and prevent unions from charging members a political levy unless they specifically agree (currently members can be charged unless they opt out). He would also repeal legislation that bans workers from secondary strikes, which are strikes from workers in support of a strike initiated by workers in a different organisation.

Welfare and health

In 2013, Corbyn co-signed a letter to The Guardian newspaper which indicated his support for the People's Assembly Against Austerity. He was a prominent sponsor of the "March for Homes".

At the Second Reading of the Welfare Reform and Work Bill in July 2015, Corbyn joined 47 Labour MPs to oppose the Bill, describing it as "rotten and indefensible", while the other three leadership candidates abstained. In August 2015, he called on Iain Duncan Smith to resign as Secretary of State for Work and Pensions after it emerged that thousands of disabled people had died after being found fit to work by Work Capability Assessments (instituted in 2008) between 2011 and 2014.

Corbyn has said that the National Health Service (NHS) should be "completely publicly run and publicly accountable" and is a supporter of the NHS Reinstatement Bill 2015. Corbyn is opposed to the Private Finance Initiative, arguing that the NHS will have to repay "six times the original investment in them". In 2010, he stated on Twitter that he believed homeopathy could work for some people and signed a parliamentary motion introduced by the Conservative MP David Tredinnick calling on the Government to consider the experiences of other countries such as India, which backs homeopathy treatment, when formulating health policy.

Corbyn is a long-standing champion for the rights of Dalits, who are treated poorly due to their lowly status under the Hindu caste system.

Corbyn has long championed the rights of overseas British pensioners who are excluded from annual up-rating adjustments to their State Pensions because of the country that they live in. He became a founder member of the All-Party Parliamentary Group on Frozen British Pensions in 2013.

Education
Corbyn envisions the establishment of a "National Education Service", on a similar model to that of the existing National Health Service. He advocates a return to local authority control over state-funded academies and free schools, and an end to the charitable status of public schools. He advocates the restoration of maintenance grants, which were replaced with loans by the UK's Conservative Government in 2015. Corbyn is also in favour of an organised "living waged national creative apprenticeship service" for Arts-based further education.

Corbyn criticised the Conservative reforms to GCSE exams starting in 2017, saying that it will leave pupils feeling "devalued" and like "failures". He also said that "going through day after day of that very complex matrix of exams and knowing that the grading system has been so changed that they're going to feel a bit devalued at the end of it".

Tuition fees
Corbyn has campaigned strongly against tuition fees in England, and supports an increase in corporation tax to fund public services such as free higher education. The 2017 Labour manifesto pledged to remove tuition fees at a cost of around £10 billion per year. Before the election, Corbyn said that he would "deal with" the existing student debt, but after the election, Shadow Chancellor John McDonnell clarified that this was an "ambition" for Labour rather than a firm promise. Labour did not know how much the student debt would cost to wipe when Corbyn made his statement, with Corbyn saying in July 2017 "We never said we would completely abolish it because we were unaware of the size of it at that time".

Energy and transport
Corbyn has supported renationalising public utilities, such as the now-privatised British Rail and energy companies back into public ownership. Initially Corbyn suggested completely renationalising the entire railway network, but would now bring them under public control "line by line" as franchises expire.

Analyses cited by The Guardian and Financial Times newspapers among others, of the renationalisation policies advocated by Corbyn, indicate a figure of at least £124 billion would be needed to purchase controlling shares in the "Big Six" national energy providers plus the National Grid. This plan would have to comply with European Union competition law, though several European countries currently have state-owned railway systems compliant with EU legislation. However future EU proposals, and in particular the fourth railway package, indicate potential forthcoming EU legislation requiring the "opening up" of passenger railway markets; thus energy and transportation markets, even if renationalised, would have to give a "right of competition" among other EU-domiciled companies.

Corbyn claims renationalisation would save money by both joining up a fragmented market, thereby reducing duplication in the privatised rail market (estimated by Ian Taylor as costing up to £1.2 billion in a 2012 report written for trade unions, but the Rail Delivery Group notes this amount includes the cost of leasing trains as well as the cost of Network Rail using private contractors, something which British Rail did as well, thus would be an inaccurate estimate of savings) and keeping what is currently profit for the energy and train operating companies. Both the energy and the train operating companies claim that they make a low return on their money (3.9% for the energy companies and 3.4% for the train companies).

In August 2015, Corbyn said he would consider introducing women-only carriages for public transport, as well as a 24-hour hotline for women to report cases of harassment. He said that although his aim was to "make public transport safer for everyone from the train platform, to the bus stop to the mode of transport itself", he would consult women on whether separate carriages would be welcome, after the idea was suggested to him. His statement was condemned by Andy Burnham, Yvette Cooper and Liz Kendall, with Cooper stating that Corbyn's plan was "turning the clock back instead of tackling the problem", while Conservative Women's Minister Nicky Morgan said she was "uncomfortable with the idea", it sounding to her like "segregation".

Nationalism and devolution

Northern England
Corbyn called George Osborne's Northern Powerhouse plan a "cruel deception" and has called for re-industrialisation in the north of England, saying that "the North has to take back power from our centralised state with real powers to invest and take decisions". Corbyn has also said that David Cameron should apologise for the treatment of northern miners during the 1984–5 miners' strike, calling for an inquiry into the Battle of Orgreave. Corbyn is in favour of the High Speed 3 train link, arguing that it should be completed before Crossrail 2 in London, as well as greater electrification of the railways.

Ireland
Corbyn is a long-standing supporter of Irish republicanism and describes himself as an "anti-imperialist campaigner" for the region. He invited two convicted bombers, Linda Quigley and Gerry MacLochlainn, to the House of Commons in 1984, from which the Party Leader Neil Kinnock "did everything in his power" to disassociate himself. MacLochlainn met with Labour's front bench in 1994, as part of a delegation. A meeting with Gerry Adams in 1996 was cancelled following pressure from Tony Blair. Corbyn responded by saying "dialogue with all parties remains essential if the peace process is to continue". He has been strongly criticised by Labour and Conservative MPs for holding meetings with former members of the PIRA in the Palace of Westminster, to discuss topics such as conditions in Northern Irish prisons and the PIRA ceasefire. At Trafalgar Square marches opposing British troops' placement in Northern Ireland, Corbyn urged (prior to the Bloody Sunday Inquiry) for the British government to officially condemn Bloody Sunday and issue an inquiry into the massacre. When Corbyn stopped the march and addressed the crowd using a bullhorn, police officers warned Corbyn against the move due to the contentious nature of the march.

Corbyn voted against the 1985 Anglo-Irish Agreement, saying that it strengthened the border between Northern Ireland and the Republic of Ireland and he opposed it as he wished to see a united Ireland. In July 1998, Corbyn endorsed the Good Friday Agreement by voting for the Northern Ireland Bill saying: "We look forward to peace, hope and reconciliation in Ireland in the future".

Following the 1987 Loughgall ambush, in which eight IRA members and one civilian were killed in a British Army operation aimed at preventing the IRA trying to blow up a police station, he attended a commemoration by the Wolfe Tone Society and stated "I'm happy to commemorate all those who died fighting for an independent Ireland".

In an interview on BBC Radio Ulster in August 2015, Corbyn said he opposed "all bombing" although he refused to express an opinion about the actions of the IRA specifically, and welcomed the ceasefire and peace process. In May 2017 he said he was "appalled" by the IRA bombing campaign. Danny Morrison, former Sinn Féin head of communications, has said that "Jeremy Corbyn never ever supported physical force in Ireland. You can have this position and still sympathise with those who died like Bobby Sands".

Scotland
When asked by Glasgow's Herald newspaper if he would describe himself as a British unionist, Corbyn replied "No, I would describe myself as a Socialist. I would prefer the UK to stay together, yes, but I recognise the right of people to take the decision on their own autonomy and independence". He criticised the decision by Scottish Labour to work with the Scottish Conservatives in the Better Together campaign, and said that he had not actively participated in the 2014 campaign for an independent Scotland. Corbyn stated his belief that economic inequality exists across the UK, and that Labour should unite people on the basis of a "radical economic strategy".

In March 2017, when asked by the Press Association about the possibility of a second independence referendum, he responded by saying that Westminster should not block one and that it would be "absolutely fine" for one to be held. However, he said Labour would still campaign in favour of the union in such an event. He later told the BBC that he had simply been arguing that it would be wrong for Westminster to prevent a vote if the Scottish parliament had agreed one. He stressed that he did not think there should be another referendum, adding that "independence would be catastrophic for many people in Scotland" as it would lead to "turbo-charged austerity".

Constitution and Royal Family
Corbyn believes the royal ceremony for the State Opening of Parliament should be abolished, saying in 1998 that: "It's absolutely ridiculous, this 18th-century performance, the horses and the knights and everybody else turning up for The Queen to read a speech she's never even read before, let alone written". Corbyn's personal preference is for Britain to become a republic, and is a republican, but said that given the Royal Family's popularity, "it's not a battle that I am fighting". In 1991, Corbyn seconded the Commonwealth of Britain Bill brought forward by Tony Benn calling for the transformation of the United Kingdom ideally into a "democratic, federal and secular Commonwealth of Britain", with an elected president, devolution, abolition of the House of Lords as it currently exists, and equality of representation by men and women in parliament. He said in a TV debate before the 2017 United Kingdom general election that abolishing the monarchy is "not on anybody's agenda, it's certainly not on my agenda".

Foreign affairs and defence

Corbyn does not consider himself an absolute pacifist and has named the Spanish Civil War, the British naval blockade to stop the slave trade in the 19th century and the role of UN peacekeepers in the 1999 crisis in East Timor as justified conflicts. However, opposing violence and war has been "the whole purpose of his life". Ronan Bennett has said that Corbyn had told him that his support for engagement with paramilitary groups was aimed at "persuad(ing) people to put away the guns". Corbyn has also said that Britain has not fought a just war since 1945.

He has made a link between British military interventions abroad, and terrorist attacks in the UK, saying that there was a link between "wars our government has supported or fought in other countries and terrorism here at home", making this statement following the Manchester Arena bombing in May 2017, and adding, "none of those acts of terror are done in the name of Islam as I understand it, any more than attacks such as Timothy McVeigh in Oklahoma were done in the name of Christianity".

Middle East

Corbyn has been vocal on Middle East foreign policy. Corbyn was actively opposed to the invasion of Iraq and war in Afghanistan, NATO-led military intervention in Libya, military strikes against Bashar al-Assad's Syria, and military action against ISIS, and has served as the chair of the Stop the War Coalition. When challenged on whether there were any circumstances in which he would deploy military services overseas he said "I'm sure there are some but I can't think of them at the moment". He had previously opposed British and American support, including arms supplies, to Iraq during the Iran–Iraq War, and condemned the chemical attack committed by the Iraqi regime against the Kurdish city of Halabja in 1988.

Corbyn has criticised Britain's close ties with Saudi Arabia and British involvement in Saudi Arabian-led intervention in Yemen. He has called for Tony Blair to be investigated for alleged war crimes during the Iraq War.

Israel and Palestine
In June 2018, during his first international trip outside Europe since he was elected Labour leader, Corbyn said: "I think there has to be a recognition of the rights of the Palestinian people to their own state which we as a Labour Party said we would recognise in government as a full state as part of the United Nations."

Corbyn is a member of the Palestine Solidarity Campaign, campaigning against conflict in Gaza and what the organisation considers to be apartheid in Israel. Corbyn has also supported limiting arms sales to Israel, saying on Electronic Intifada: "I think we have to push robustly for the limitation of arms supplies ... Israel is after all facing an investigation ... for war crimes, [at the International Criminal Court] as indeed are the Hamas forces on a much different or lesser scale". In August 2016, Corbyn said: "I am not in favour of the academic or cultural boycott of Israel, and I am not in favour of a blanket boycott of Israeli goods. I do support targeted boycotts aimed at undermining the existence of illegal settlements in the West Bank."

Hamas and Hezbollah
At a meeting hosted by Stop the War Coalition in 2009, Corbyn said he invited "friends" from Hamas and Hezbollah to an event in parliament, referred to Hamas as "an organisation dedicated towards the good of the Palestinian people and bringing about long term peace and social justice and political justice in the whole region" and said that the British government's labelling of Hamas as a terrorist organisation is "a big, big historical mistake". Asked on Channel 4 News in July 2015 why he had called representatives from Hamas and Hezbollah "friends", Corbyn explained, "I use it in a collective way, saying our friends are prepared to talk," and that the specific occasion he used it was to introduce speakers from Hezbollah at a Parliamentary meeting about the Middle East. He said that he does not condone the actions of either organisation: "Does it mean I agree with Hamas and what it does? No. Does it mean I agree with Hezbollah and what they do? No. What it means is that I think to bring about a peace process, you have to talk to people with whom you may profoundly disagree ... There is not going to be a peace process unless there is talks involving Israel, Hezbollah and Hamas and I think everyone knows that".

Iran

Corbyn has spoken in favour of improved international relations with Iran and against its "demonisation" by Western countries, including at events organised to celebrate the Iranian Revolution.

In 2014, Corbyn spoke at the Islamic Centre of England at an event celebrating the 35th anniversary of the Iranian Revolution. He praised Iran's "tolerance and acceptance of other faiths, traditions and ethnic groupings in Iran" and said "I respect Iran's history. I respect what brought about the revolution in 1979".

Corbyn has called for the lifting of sanctions as part of a negotiated full settlement of issues concerning the Iranian nuclear programme. He has also been supportive of Quds Day rallies.

Saudi Arabia

Corbyn has criticised Britain's close ties with Saudi Arabia and British involvement in the Saudi Arabian-led intervention in Yemen. In January 2016, after a United Nations panel ruled Saudi-led bombing campaign of Yemen contravened international humanitarian law, Corbyn called for an independent inquiry into the UK's arms exports policy to Saudi Arabia. Corbyn and Hilary Benn wrote to David Cameron asking him to "set out the exact nature of the involvement of UK personnel working with the Saudi military". He has constantly called for the British Government to stop selling arms to Saudi Arabia. In July 2017, he told Al Jazeera English, "We have constantly condemned the use of these weapons by Saudi Arabia in Yemen, and called for the suspension of the arms sales to Saudi Arabia to show that we are wanting a peace process in Yemen, not an invasion by Saudi Arabia".

Syria

In November 2014, Corbyn questioned subjective "legal obstacles" put in place for UK fighters returning from the Syrian Civil War, including those who had fought for ISIS and the Syrian Government as well as the Free Syrian Army, arguing that "There are an awful lot of contradictions surrounding how we decide who is a good fighter and who is a terrorist; who is struggling for liberation and who is a terrorist". Corbyn said "I have no support for ISIS whatsoever, and obviously that should apply to someone who has committed crimes, but we should bear in mind that expressing a political point of view is not in itself an offence". He called on the Government to think about this rather more carefully and avoid the knee-jerk reaction of saying, "These are bad fighters and those are good fighters, so we will ban these and allow those in".

In November 2015, Labour were split over whether to back air strikes in Syria. However, Corbyn offered Labour MPs a free vote but made it clear that opposition to airstrikes is official Labour party policy, backed by the membership. Corbyn thought that Prime Minister David Cameron did not make a "convincing case" that airstrikes would strengthen not undermine Britain's national security and "did not set out a coherent strategy, coordinated through the United Nations, for the defeat of (IS)" nor "explain what credible and acceptable ground forces could retake and hold territory freed from (IS) control by an intensified air campaign" and believed Cameron was "unable to explain the contribution of additional UK bombing to a comprehensive negotiated political settlement of the Syrian civil war, or its likely impact on the threat of terrorist attacks in the UK".

In April 2017, the United States' airstrikes on a Syrian air base, in response to the use of chemical weapons by Assad, were opposed by Corbyn, saying it risked "escalating the war in Syria still further" and "unilateral military action without legal authorisation or independent verification risks intensifying a multi-sided conflict that has already killed hundreds of thousands of people". He instead suggested the international community should "reconvene the Geneva peace talks and unrelenting international pressure for a negotiated settlement of the conflict". He later added: "it's nobody's interests for this war to continue. Let's get the Geneva process going quickly. In the meantime, no more strikes. Have the UN investigation into the war crime of the use of chemical weapons in Syria and take it on from there" and to "bring about a political solution".

In April 2018, responding to the U.S, UK and France airstrikes in Syria, Corbyn called for an independent UN-led investigation of the chemical weapons attack so that those responsible can be held to account and thought Prime Minister Theresa May should have sought parliamentary approval before taking military action. Corbyn urged May to remember the lessons of intelligence failures in the buildup to the Iraq war and said: "There has to be a proper process of consultation. Cabinet on its own should not be making this decision." Corbyn also called for 'war powers act' as check on military intervention that would force future UK governments to seek approval from parliament.

Osama bin Laden

In an interview with Press TV, he stated about Osama bin Laden's death that there was "no attempt whatsoever that I can see to arrest him and put him on trial, to go through that process" and that "this was an assassination attempt, and is yet another tragedy, upon a tragedy, upon a tragedy". Corbyn said his view about the desirability of putting bin Laden on trial was shared by Boris Johnson and Barack Obama.

Kurdistan and Kurds 
Firat News Agency reported in 2016 that, in a meeting organised by British Kurdish People's Assembly, Corbyn said that "if peace is wanted in the region, the Kurdish people's right to self-determination must be accepted." Commenting on the status of Abdullah Öcalan, it was reported he remarked "if there will be a peace process and solution, Öcalan must be free and at the table."

At Chatham House in 2017 he was asked if he would "condemn the genocide which is going on against the Kurds in Syria and in Turkey", Corbyn responded with "I would be very strong with the Turkish government on its treatment of Kurdish people and minorities and the way in which it's denied them their decency and human rights". On warfare by Turkey against the Kurds, Corbyn stated, "If arms are being used to oppress people internally in violation of international law then they simply should not be supplied to them".

Russia
Following the poisoning in Salisbury in March 2018 of Sergei Skripal by a Novichok nerve agent, the UK Government expelled a number of Russian diplomats. However, Corbyn indicated that he would still be prepared to engage with Vladimir Putin, and suggested that further actions against Russia should be avoided until evidence against direct Kremlin involvement in the attack could be verified. He acknowledged, however, that the material was manufactured by the Russian state but told the BBC: "Would I do business with Putin? Sure. And I’d challenge him on human rights in Russia, challenge him on these issues and challenge him on that whole basis of that relationship." In September 2018 he condemned the Salisbury attack as an "outrage and beyond reckless", after the Government released details that indicated that the perpetrators were from Russia's military intelligence service and that the poisoning had been sanctioned at a senior level of the Russian state.

NATO and Ukraine

Corbyn has been a long-time critic of the North Atlantic Treaty Organization (NATO). In May 2012 he authored a piece in the Morning Star titled "High time for an end to NATO" where he described the organisation as an " instrument of cold war manipulation". He further expanded both in the same piece, saying, "The collapse of the Soviet Union in 1990, with the ending of the Warsaw Pact mutual defence strategy, was the obvious time for Nato to have been disbanded.", and elsewhere in a 2014 speech where he called the organisation an "engine for the delivery of oil to the oil companies" and called for it to "give up, go home and go away."

For these comments and a refusal to answer whether he would defend a NATO ally in the case of attack he was criticised by Anders Fogh Rasmussen, the former Prime Minister of Denmark and Nato Secretary General, who said Corbyn's opinions were "tempting President Putin to aggression" and made comparisons between his views and those of the American president Donald Trump. He was also criticised by George Robertson, former Labour party defence secretary, who said "It beggars belief that the leader of the party most responsible for the collective security pact of Nato should be so reckless as to undermine it by refusing to say he would come to the aid of an ally.".

In April 2014, Corbyn wrote another article for the Morning Star in which he attributed the crisis in Ukraine to the actions of NATO. He said the "root of the crisis" lay in "the US drive to expand eastwards" and described Russia's actions as "not unprovoked". He has said it "probably was" a mistake to allow former Warsaw Pact countries to join NATO: "NATO expansion and Russian expansion – one leads to the other, and one reflects the other".

Corbyn's views on Ukraine, Russia, and NATO were criticised by a number of writers, including Halya Coynash of the Kharkiv Human Rights Protection Group, Anne Applebaum in The Sunday Times, Ben Judah in The Independent, and Roger Boyes in The Times. Writing for The Daily Telegraph, Edward Lucas  saw Corbyn as having a "desire to appease Russia by sacrificing Ukraine" and said that Corbyn's "anti-imperialist sentiments did not stretch to understanding countries such as Ukraine". In a letter to The Guardian, Lithuanian ambassador Asta Skaisgirytė disagreed with Corbyn's portrayal of NATO, saying her country was not "forced or lured into NATO as part of an American global power grab. We were pounding on the door of the alliance, demanding to be let in".

Corbyn told The Guardian in August 2015: "I am not an admirer or supporter of Putin's foreign policy, or of Russian or anybody else's expansion". Corbyn has said that, although he would like to pull the United Kingdom out of NATO, he acknowledges that there is not an appetite for it among the public and instead intends to push for NATO to "restrict its role".

Following the 2022 Russian invasion of Ukraine, Corbyn wrote an opinion article on Jacobin, stating that he was "horrified at the war in Ukraine, horrified at the loss of life, horrified at the bombardment, and horrified at the future" and calling to "apply political pressure on Russia and support the public pressure that’s there in Russia to end this war and to withdraw the Russian forces", in order to return to the Minsk agreements. He also praised the 2022 anti-war protests in Russia, comparing them to the protests against the Iraq War and the protests against the Vietnam War. In the same article, he defended the positions of the Stop the War Coalition, which had been accused by Labour Leader Keir Starmer of harbouring pro-Russian sentiments. In May 2022, he criticised the British government for accepting only a small number of Ukrainian refugees. He said that "The war is obviously disgraceful, and the Russian invasion is wrong at every level and conclusively."

Falklands
In 1982 Corbyn opposed the sending of British troops sent to retake the islands during the Falklands war, instead declaring the war to be a "Tory plot" and condemning the war as a "nauseating waste of lives and money". Before the 2017 United Kingdom general election, he said that he "wanted a UN brokered plan" and "there should have been an opportunity to prevent that war happening by the UN". Corbyn supports a "negotiated settlement" with the Falkland Islands that may involve "some degree of joint administration" with Argentina. His election as party leader was welcomed by Argentine president Cristina Kirchner who described him as a "great friend of Latin America".

Cuba
Corbyn is a longtime supporter of the Cuba Solidarity Campaign, which campaigns against the US embargo against Cuba and supports the Cuban Revolution. In November 2016, following the death of former communist President of Cuba Fidel Castro, Corbyn said that Castro, despite his "flaws", was a "huge figure of modern history, national independence and 20th Century socialism...Castro's achievements were many".

Venezuela
A proponent of the Venezuela Solidarity Campaign, Corbyn praised Hugo Chávez,  the socialist President of Venezuela, as "an inspiration to all of us fighting back against austerity and neoliberal economics in Europe" in 2013 and following Chávez' death, said "he made massive contributions to Venezuela & a very wide world". Corbyn also shared support for Chávez's successor, President Nicolás Maduro, in 2014 while congratulating him on his presidency. Following the 2017 Venezuelan Constituent Assembly election, pressure was mounted on Corbyn to speak out against President Maduro's election. Corbyn condemned "violence done by all sides" but did not criticise Maduro specifically.

Chagos Islands

Corbyn was chair of the All-Party Parliamentary Group (APPG) on the Chagos Islands. He has advocated for the rights of the forcibly-removed Chagossians to return to the British Indian Ocean Territory, following the depopulation programme of between 1968 and 1973. He has lobbied former US President Barack Obama about the matter.

Catalonia
Following the 2017 Spanish constitutional crisis and 2017 Catalan independence referendum, Corbyn said that Spain should stop the "police violence against citizens in Catalonia". He also said that Theresa May should intervene and call on Mariano Rajoy to find a "political solution to this constitutional crisis".

Nuclear weapons

Corbyn is strongly opposed to weapons of mass destruction (WMD) and a long-time supporter of the Campaign for Nuclear Disarmament (CND), which he joined in 1966 whilst at school. He became one of its three vice-chairs. Corbyn opposes the replacement of Britain's Trident nuclear weapons system, and supports the creation of a Defence Diversification Agency to assist the transfer of jobs and skills to the civilian sector. In his leadership election campaign, Corbyn suggested that the 11,000 jobs supported by Trident could be replaced by "socially productive" jobs in renewable energy, railways and housing. Corbyn hinted he might allow party members who support Trident replacement to back it in a free vote, but also said that defence chiefs would be under instructions not to use nuclear weapons under any circumstances if he was Prime Minister.

During the 2016 Labour Party (UK) leadership election, Corbyn reiterated his position, vowing to vote against Trident on 18 July  "I will be voting against continuous at-sea deterrent, because it rules out any compliance with the nuclear non-proliferation treaty”. Corbyn allowed a free vote on the issue, with 140 MPs voting in favour of Trident in line with the party's longstanding policy and 47 joining Corbyn in voting against". Afterwards, Corbyn reiterated his position that the UK should "move rapidly towards [nuclear] disarmament". Since over half of the Labour MPs voted against Corbyn's position, The Daily Telegraph billed this event as "the biggest rebellion of his leadership" and reported that "Corbyn was told by his backbenchers that he was holding Labour members in 'contempt'" by voting against the party's pro-Trident policy.

The Labour 2017 general election manifesto said "any prime minister should be extremely cautious about ordering the use of weapons of mass destruction", adding that "As a nuclear armed power, our country has a responsibility to fulfil our international obligations under the Nuclear Non-Proliferation Treaty. Labour will lead multilateral efforts ... to create a nuclear free world". Corbyn said he would "respect the decision" of the party not to commit to nuclear disarmament but declined to say that he had changed his own position He added that there would be a review to "look at the role of nuclear weapons" if Labour won.

North Korea
Corbyn stated during heightened tensions between North Korea and the US, that the UK should not get involved in any military action with the country, saying that, "our government must not drag our country into any military action over the Korea crisis, including joint exercises" and that there could be "no question of blind loyalty to the erratic and belligerent Trump administration". He further added that "any nuclear conflict over North Korea today would kill millions of innocent people in the Korean peninsula and beyond".

Kosovo

Corbyn opposed the 1999 NATO intervention in Kosovo and in 2004 signed an Early Day motion which praised John Pilger for his "expose" of the "fraudulent justifications for intervening in a 'genocide' that never really existed" during the buildup to the Kosovo War.

Turkey

He has opposed Turkish bombing of Kurds along the Turkey-Syria border, describing how it undermines the fight against ISIS in the region. Before the 2016 United Kingdom European Union membership referendum, he was going to travel to Turkey to make a speech calling for Turkey to join the EU, but stopped these travel plans after fears from the remain campaign that this would "sabotage the campaign to keep us in Europe".

West Papua
He has pledged his support for a United Nations supervised vote of independence in the region of West Papua, which was annexed by Indonesia in 1969. At a function attended by Pacific region leaders, Corbyn said his party would make human rights a "cornerstone" of their foreign policy if elected. Corbyn, the co-founder of the International Parliamentarians for West Papua group, urged the international community to assist the western half of the island shared with Papua New Guinea gain independence from Indonesian rule.

Corbyn said in an international meeting that, "Essentially what we’re looking at is a group of people who did not enjoy their rights during a period of decolonisation, did not enjoy the rights bestowed to them by the UN charter and by the statutes on decolonisation", adding "It’s about a political strategy that brings to worldwide recognition the plight of the people of West Papua, forces it onto a political agenda, forces it to the UN, forces an exposure of it and ultimately that allows the people of West Papua to make the choice of the kind of government they want and the kind of society in which they want to live. That is a fundamental right."

United States

Corbyn has said he would want with the US a "strong and friendly relationship", while "not be[ing] afraid to speak our mind". He has also said the country "is the strongest military power on the planet by a very long way. It has a special responsibility to use its power with care and to support international efforts to resolve conflicts collectively and peacefully". He has also said that US President, Donald Trump, "seems determined to add to the dangers [in the global situation] by recklessly escalating the confrontation with North Korea, unilaterally launching missile strikes on Syria, opposing President Obama’s nuclear arms deal with Iran and backing a new nuclear arms race". Following Trump's withdrawal of the US from the Paris Agreement, he said it was a "very big shame", further saying that "Donald Trump's decision to pull the United States out of the Paris climate change deal is reckless and dangerous".

Privacy and surveillance
Although previously denouncing the extension of mass surveillance as a "travesty of parliamentary democracy" and pledging to protect British citizens from "unwarranted snooping on their online activities by the security services" as part of a "people's charter of digital liberties", Corbyn has supported the Investigatory Powers Act 2016, nicknamed the "snooper's charter" by its opponents. Whistleblower Edward Snowden described the Act as "the most extreme surveillance in the history of western democracy. It goes further than many autocracies".

European Union
In the 1975 European Communities referendum put forward by the Labour Party in the United Kingdom, Corbyn opposed Britain's membership of the EEC. Corbyn also opposed the ratification of the Maastricht Treaty in 1993, saying: "... the whole basis of the Maastricht treaty is the establishment of a European central bank which is staffed by bankers, independent of national Governments and national economic policies, and whose sole policy is the maintenance of price stability[.] That will undermine any social objective that any Labour Government in the United Kingdom—or any other Government—would wish to carry out. ... The Maastricht treaty does not take us in the direction of the checks and balances contained in the American federal constitution[.] It takes us in the opposite direction of an unelected legislative body—the [European] Commission—and, in the case of foreign policy, a policy Commission that will be, in effect, imposing foreign policy on nation states that have fought for their own democratic accountability".

Corbyn also opposed the Lisbon Treaty in 2008 and backed a proposed referendum on British withdrawal from the European Union in 2011. Additionally, he accused the institution of acting "brutally" in the 2015 Greek crisis, accusing the EU of allowing financiers to destroy its economy.

In July 2015, Corbyn said that if Prime Minister David Cameron negotiated away workers' rights and environmental protection as part of his renegotiation of Britain's membership of the European Union (EU), he would not rule out advocating for a British exit in a proposed referendum on EU membership, and that he was in favour of leaving the EU if it became a "totally brutal organisation". Pro-European Labour MPs and campaigners expressed fear that Corbyn's lukewarm attitude towards the EU would convince Labour voters towards withdrawal. Subsequently, in September 2015, Corbyn said that Labour would campaign for Britain to stay in the EU regardless of the result of Cameron's negotiations, and instead pledged "to reverse any changes" if Cameron reduced the rights of workers or citizens. He also believed that Britain should play a crucial role in Europe by making demands about working arrangements across the continent, the levels of corporation taxation and in forming an agreement on environmental regulation.

Remain and reform

Corbyn made a speech on 14 April 2016, in which he supported staying in the EU; but in which he also repeated some of his earlier criticisms of the Union's structures: "Over the years I have been critical of many decisions taken by the EU, and I remain critical of its shortcomings; from its lack of democratic accountability to the institutional pressure to deregulate or privatise public services". He summarised his stance as being "for 'Remain – and Reform' in Europe".

In June 2016, in the run-up to the EU referendum, Corbyn said that there was an "overwhelming case" for staying in the EU. In a speech in London, Corbyn said "We, the Labour Party, are overwhelmingly for staying in, because we believe the European Union has brought investment, jobs and protection for workers, consumers and the environment". Corbyn also criticised media coverage and warnings from both sides, saying that the debate had been dominated too much by "myth-making and prophecies of doom". In the same speech, Corbyn listed various criticisms of the EU, and stated: "that’s not to say we can be satisfied with the European Union as it is". He also rejected the claims that leaving the European Union would lead to a "year-long recession", implying that George Osborne had made the claim in error, adding "This is the same George Osborne who predicted his austerity policies would close the deficit by 2015. That's now scheduled for 2021".

Support for leaving the single market due to state aid rules

In September 2016, Corbyn urged the government to abandon existing EU rules on state aid, saying the rules will be "no longer valid", after Britain leaves the bloc.

In May 2017 the European Union said they would not accept a customs deal that involved changes to the existing EU rules on state aid. Corbyn had previously suggested that the UK could abandon EU rules on state aid once Britain had left the EU. Britain is currently bound by the EU rules on state aid, as are all states within the Single Market. The UK would need to maintain these rules if it were to remain in the single market and customs union

In July 2017, Corbyn said that Britain could not remain in the single market after leaving the EU, saying that membership of the single market was "dependent on membership of the EU". Shadow Minister Barry Gardiner later clarified that Corbyn meant that Labour interpreted the referendum result as wanting to leave the single market, with others pointing out that several countries are in the single market but not in the EU.

In 2018, Corbyn said his main reason for not committing to remaining in the single market was freedom from EU rules on state aid to industry. He said the UK government should not be "held back, inside or outside the EU, from taking the steps we need to support cutting edge industries and local business". An anonymous senior EU official interviewed by The Times said that state subsidisation would be a red line in negotiations, as it would lead to a possible trade war between the UK and EU. The senior figure told The Times: "We have to protect ourselves and the single market ... If a Corbyn government implements his declared policies the level playing field mechanism will lead to increased costs for Britain to access the single market because of distortions caused by state aid."

In July 2019 Corbyn changed his position, coming out fully in support of a second referendum on the issue of the UK leaving the EU and saying Labour would campaign for remain if the Conservatives initiated a second referendum. However Corbyn did not confirm nor deny whether he and Labour will back remain in a referendum if he becomes Prime Minister and gets to renegotiate the EU Withdrawal Agreement and the option on the ballot will be his renegotiated deal or remain.

Support for a second referendum

Jeremy Corbyn opposed calls for a second referendum on the UK's membership of the EU until two events changed his mind: Labour conference adopted a motion in support of a second referendum in September 2018 and then a number of centrist MPs split with the party in February 2019 to form Change UK.

During the indicative votes on how to proceed regarding Brexit, Corbyn whipped a vote in favour of a public vote on the Brexit deal, but was defied by 40 Labour MPs in the second round (including 16 abstentions). Meanwhile other centrist Labour MPs like Gloria de Piero and Stephen Kinnock began lobbying Corbyn to not take up a second referendum.

In May 2019, following the 2019 European Parliament election, Corbyn endorsed holding a referendum on the withdrawal agreement regardless of who negotiates it, confirming this support in a July letter to party members saying "The Labour Party will now challenge whoever emerges as the leader of the Conservative Party [referring to the 2019 conservative party leadership election] to have the confidence to put their deal to the people in a referendum, with remain on the ballot, in which Labour would campaign for remain."

Abortion
Corbyn has supported buffer zones outside abortion clinics and pregnancy advisory bureaux to protect people from anti-abortion protesters. Corbyn has also supported British developmental aid funding abortions for those impregnated by rape during warfare. He has pledged to extend the 1967 Abortion Act to Northern Ireland.

Cannabis
In 2000, Corbyn signed an Early Day Motion calling for the decriminalisation of cannabis. Despite saying he has never smoked cannabis himself, Corbyn said in the 2015 Labour leadership election "we should be adult and grown up and decriminalise cannabis". Later, in the 2016 Labour leadership election, Corbyn called for the decriminalisation of cannabis for medicinal purposes, but said that he would not support legalising recreational drugs. He said about them that he wanted people to be "educated away from" taking drugs, and further stated that he "would also want to look at supporting people who want to get out of the drugs trade in other parts of the world because there is the horrors of the drugs war that's going on in Central America".

Environment and animal rights
Corbyn has been a strong advocate for environmentalism. During his leadership bid in 2015, he published a "Protecting Our Planet Manifesto", detailing plans for a "Green Investment Bank" that would invest in green technologies such as renewable energy. He advocates a ban on hydraulic fracking, a phasing out of fossil fuel extraction, and investment in public transport to improve air quality. Corbyn is in favour of building new nuclear power stations, and has stated that if coal prices increase there might be a case for mining high quality coal again in conjunction with carbon neutral clean burn technology, though the technology was complicated and very expensive.

Corbyn has been a long-time campaigner on animal rights issues. He was one of the first signatories to Tony Banks' "Pigeon Bombs" Early Day Motion, and, in 2015, he signed up to another Motion calling for a ban on the importation of foie gras into the UK as well as sponsoring a Motion opposing the Yulin Dog Meat Festival. He sponsored two Early Day Motions relating to the McLibel case.

LGBT issues
An advocate of LGBT rights since his days as a London councillor in the 1970s, Corbyn championed such causes as the Lesbians and Gays Support the Miners (LGSM), civil partnerships and same-sex marriage, and support for the Equality Bill. He was the only Labour MP to vote in favour of a Liberal Democrat amendment to outlaw discrimination based on sexuality in 1998, before the ratification of the Equality Act 2006. Corbyn voted in favour of the Marriage (Same Sex Couples) Act 2013, which ultimately legalised same-sex marriage in England and Wales. He has also threatened "economic and diplomatic consequences" on those countries not supporting LGBT rights. Corbyn supported the appointment of Michael Cashman as Labour's specialist LGBT rights international envoy in 2014. He has also claimed that he would extend same-sex marriage to Northern Ireland and reverse the gay blood ban enacted by the Democratic Unionist Party, were he to become prime minister.

Actions against racism
Corbyn was a campaigner against apartheid in South Africa, serving on the National Executive of the Anti-Apartheid Movement.

In 1985, he was appointed national secretary of the newly launched Anti-Fascist Action.

He organised a demonstration against a 1970s National Front march through Wood Green; spoke on the 80th anniversary of the Battle of Cable Street, noting that his mother was a protester; signed numerous Early Day Motions condemning antisemitism; in 1987, campaigned to reverse Islington Council's decision to grant the planning application to destroy a Jewish cemetery; and in 2010, called on the UK government to facilitate the settlement of Yemeni Jews in Britain.

References

External links

What is Jeremy Corbyn's programme for government? (BBC News Online)
What does Jeremy Corbyn think? (The Guardian)
The 9 charts that show the 'left-wing' policies of Jeremy Corbyn the public actually agrees with (The Independent)
What does Jeremy Corbyn stand for? (The Daily Telegraph)

Jeremy Corbyn
Political positions of British politicians